Cherkasskoye is a village in Almaty Region of south-eastern Kazakhstan. Cherkasskoye is located near the Lepsi River.

References

External links
Tageo.com

Populated places in Almaty Region